Penn Township is a township in Sullivan County, in the U.S. state of Missouri.

Penn Township most likely was named after the local Penn family.

References

Townships in Missouri
Townships in Sullivan County, Missouri